The Valparaíso Region is one of Chile's 16 first order administrative divisions. The region also includes the remote Easter Island (Rapa Nui) in the Pacific Ocean.

Its capital is the port city of Valparaíso; other important cities include Viña del Mar, Quillota, San Felipe, Quilpué, Villa Alemana, and San Antonio.

Administration 
As a region, Valparaíso is a first-level administrative division. Since 2021 the region is governed by the governor, who is elected by popular vote. The current governor is Rodrigo Mundaca (Broad Font).

Geography and natural features
The region is on the same latitude as the Santiago Metropolitan Region. Its capital is Valparaíso, which is the site for the National Congress of Chile and an important commercial port. Also in this region is the top resort city of Viña del Mar. Additionally, the Pacific islands of Easter Island, Isla Salas y Gómez, the Juan Fernández Islands and the Desventuradas Islands fall under the Valparaíso Region's administration.

The Valparaíso Region is part of the very restricted range of the endangered Chilean wine palm (Jubaea chilensis); in prehistoric times, this endemic Chilean tree had a significantly larger range.

Demographics
The Valparaíso Region is populated by some 1.71 million inhabitants. The population density reached 94.1 inhabitants/km2. 91.6% of the population lives in urban areas and only 8.4% of the population lives in rural areas.

The most populous municipalities in the region are Valparaíso, with 308,000 inhabitants and Viña del Mar, with 287,000 inhabitants, which together with Villa Alemana, Quilpué and Concón form the Greater Valparaíso, a continuum of 1.75 million people. There are also Quillota, with about 201,000 inhabitants and San Antonio with more than 200,000 inhabitants with estimates at 250,000 to be the region's second-largest city.

Immigration and culture

Valparaíso developed as a trans-oceanic rest stop for fishing ships, sea cruise-liners, and international naval ships. Therefore, a large proportion of residents have a variety of national origins, ethnic groups, and cultures. The 16th-century colonial population was founded by male settlers from the Spanish regions of Andalusia, Asturia and León, and the large Basque contingent has given rise to a substantial Basque Chilean population. Large numbers came from other countries of Latin America from Mexico to Uruguay, esp. came during colonial rule in the 17th century. And in the late 18th–early 19th centuries came a small wave of Galician settlers from the Spanish region of Galicia.

It is thought the majority of Valparaíso's people have some non-Spanish European background, such as: British and Irish, Australians and New Zealanders, North Americans (U.S. or Canadian), Croats and Bosnians, Dutch and Belgians, French, Germans, Greeks, Italians, Portuguese and Scandinavians. Also, there are more or less assimilated groups of Chilean Jews (mostly Ashkenazi), as well as Christians from the Ottoman Empire, primarily Syro-Lebanese and a large Palestinian community in the town of La Calera.

In racial terms, the majority of Valparaíso's inhabitants are castizos, meaning that their paternal origins are overwhelmingly from white whalers, settlers and traders of various European nationalities, including colonial Spanish settlers, while their maternal origins usually stems from unions between colonial Spanish men and local indigenous women, including those of Mapuche, Inca, Aymara and North American Indian descent (transplanted Cherokees are reported to come in the late 19th century, though it could well be a myth). Smaller numbers of East Asians, mostly Chinese, Japanese or Korean, minuscule numbers of Afro-Chileans, as well as a component of Polynesians whose ancestors were kidnapped from Easter Island and the Marquesas Islands, further added to the region's Hispanicized melting pot.

Economics and industry
The Valparaíso Region is a host of agricultural lands, wine producers, and industrial activity such as copper mining and cement.

The region also is a hub for chemicals and gas storage near the port of Quintero.  In the interior valleys, there is a booming export industry, mainly around the avocado (palta), chirimoyas and flowers.  The most striking recent development has been the cultivation of hillsides using high-tech drip feed irrigation. This has allowed otherwise dry and unproductive land to bear high yields.

Provinces and communes

References
 C. Michael Hogan (2008) Chilean Wine Palm: Jubaea chilensis, GlobalTwitcher.com, ed. Nicklas Stromberg
 Valparaíso Region, Chile (2006)

Line notes

Citations

External links
Gobierno Regional de Valparaíso  Official website 
Robinson Crusoe, Moai statues and the Rapa Nui: the stories of Chile’s far-off islands 

 
Regions of Chile